Hilarocassis exclamationis is a species of leaf beetle in the family Chrysomelidae. It is found in the Caribbean Sea, Central America, North America, and South America.

References

Further reading

 
 

Cassidinae
Articles created by Qbugbot
Beetles described in 1767
Taxa named by Carl Linnaeus